Loxostege comptalis is a species of moth in the family Crambidae. It is found in France, Spain, Croatia, Ukraine and Russia. It is also found in North Africa (including Tunisia) and in Turkey.

References

Moths described in 1848
Pyraustinae
Moths of Europe
Insects of Turkey